"Kang Dynasty", sometimes called "Kang War", is a 16 part comic book storyline which ran through Avengers (vol. 3) #41-55 and Avengers Annual 2001 between June 2001 and August 2002. It was written by Kurt Busiek and illustrated by a number of artists including Alan Davis, Kieron Dwyer, Ivan Reis and Manuel Garcia.

The story features Kang the Conqueror, a warlord from the 30th century, and one of the Avengers’ oldest and deadliest foes, arriving in the early 21st century with his son Marcus intent on conquering the planet. Although Kang is temporarily successful, the first villain in Marvel Comics to physically take over the world (as opposed through mind control, as Doctor Doom once accomplished by amplifying the powers of the Purple Man) he is opposed and eventually defeated by the Avengers.

The story is noteworthy for its length, as well as depicting the destruction of the United Nations headquarters building (though without loss of life, as Kang saved them all to make a point) and the death of the entire population of Washington, D.C.; it had been planned before the events of September 11, 2001, but was published afterwards as Marvel Comics decided not to alter the storyline.

Plot summary
Kang the Conqueror appears with his son Marcus, the new Scarlet Centurion in front of the U.N, after Marcus is barely defeated by Goliath, Triathlon, Iron Man, Vision, Wasp, and Warbird, and destroys the building using a blast from a space base, Damocles, which is shaped like a giant sword, but when Wasp talks of the murders he has committed, he shows none of the occupants have been killed. Kang creates a force-field around the group, and shows many visions of the Earth's possible futures, all of them dark and horrific. At first it is thought he intends to help the Earth, but then he announces that he wishes to conquer it in order to save it. Kang tells the UN that he will strike at France first. He then announces that any who conquer land in his name will have a place in his new order. Several groups and foes—including the Presence, the Deviants, and Attuma's Atlanteans, attack across the world. Kang knew that against an invading army the Earth would unite but against their own, they would be fractured. He then teleports away with the Centurion, by threatening to strike with lethal force if they make another attack. Meanwhile, the Presence is attacking Russia with a group of radioactive ghost-like creatures that most of the Soviet-Super Soldiers have been turned into and who several Avengers member meet.

After these attacks are stopped, Kang launches his invasion of Europe with his army from the far future. The Avengers and UN troops fight back valiantly at the ramparts they had constructed, while the American forces are occupied with an attack by the self-proclaimed Master of The World, who creates technological towers capable of resisting Kang around all major North American cities. Warbird finally manages to kill him—with some subtle assistance from Kang's son, who is infatuated with her.

The Avengers try to infiltrate Kang's starship, Damocles Base. Meanwhile, as part of a wrap up to a long-running plotline, the Avengers discover that the religious cult known as the Triune Understanding is trying to protect Earth from a mysterious threat named the Triple Evil. After the attack fails, the Avengers who had launched the attack (including Captain America) are stranded in space. Kang seizes control of the Sentinel Fleet the US planned to protect themselves with, and uses a futuristic weapon to devastate Washington DC and kill millions. With the threat of more such attacks, the world has no choice but to surrender to Kang, with the Wasp personally doing so for the Avengers.

The Avengers stranded in space are saved by Quasar and the Triune Understanding, aided by Justice, Firestar and Vision, who warn them that the Triple Evil has arrived; an enormous floating black pyramid on the far side of the moon. They confront it and eventually triumph, the ancient power of the billions the Triple Evil had destroyed passing to Triathlon, who becomes the re-embodiment of 3D-Man. Jonathan Tremont, the head of the Understanding, who had wanted the power for himself, is captured. The Avengers then learn that Earth has been conquered by Kang.

On Earth, Kang and the Scarlet Centurion are gloating over their victory when they are told the Avengers are attacking their main prison. Thor and the Avengers left on Earth free Wasp and many other heroes, taking them to the Master's base, which they use as their new base of operations. They discover how to activate his technology (the huge ring-walls) across America, which prove a massive threat to Kang. Their plan is to distract him so that Warbird, Thor, Iron Man, Wonder Man and Firestar can attack Damocles Base, with the Master's technology hopefully taking down its protective force field. Wasp has reservations until the President himself, who is safely at the base, encourages her to do it. She agrees, but first says she has to make some calls.

Meanwhile, Captain America's team in space heads for Earth, using the Pyramid's power. On Earth, Kang declares that he will destroy a city each hour until the Avengers surrender. Before he makes good his threat, the Master's technological towers erupt from the ground and attack. Thanks to Jan's calls, across the world others assault Kang's forces, including the Presence, the Atlanteans and the Deviants. With his forces locked in a counter-attack, Kang and the Centurion retreat to Damocles Base. From there, he locates the Avengers' new base and opens fire on it. Facing a no-win situation, the five heroes who had agreed to attack his base take off anyway. Just as Kang is about to triumph, the Pyramid materializes beside Damocles Base, opening fire on it. Captain America tells Triathlon to ready the technology.

Kang uses his technology to project an enormous holographic projection of himself in Space. He tells the Avengers that he can counter all their capabilities. Kang turns to find an enormous holographic projection of Captain America in space beside him, the same size, saying "Now you miserable jacked-up little tin Hitler... Let's end this."

Vision, Quasar, Justice, Jack of Hearts, Firestar and Photon attack Kang's base along with the pyramid, even as the giant Captain battles the giant Kang. Damocles Base focuses its fire on the pyramid, allowing the Earth defenses to attack it, even as the heroes from Earth join the battle against it. The Presence and Starlight also fly into space to aid them. Kang has the edge on Captain America and is about to defeat him, but at that point the damage to Damocles Base becomes so severe, Kang is unable to maintain the holographic projection.

Triathlon is unsure whether or not to continue using his power, since it belongs to dead civilizations. Enraged, the captive Tremont uses his remaining power to break free and charge into space, using all of his power to take down the Damocles Base force field, even as he himself is vaporized. The Avengers assault the base, and Warbird destroys the main core. Kang then forces the Scarlet Centurion to take a capsule to his own time, leaving Kang to die honorably. The Avengers evacuate as the crippled Damocles Base plunges to Earth.

The base crash lands in Maryland, causing devastation. Kang alone survives, finding the Avengers waiting as he emerges from the ruin. He tells them he wishes to die fighting. Captain America steps up to battle him alone, shield against sword. The Captain defeats Kang in battle, and takes him into captivity. Triathlon declares he has to leave to get in touch with himself as the Avengers fly back. They are told that most of Kang's armies are now surrendering. Across the world, millions of people cheered their salvation, celebrating. The festivities are interrupted when the Avengers discover that the Master's base is beginning to self-destruct.

Kang, in his cell, is content to die as he had built an Empire, won great victories and even defeated the Avengers. However, the Scarlet Centurion arrives and saves him. An angry Kang tells Marcus that he should not have done so, but returns to his ship. Kang takes Marcus into his private chambers, which is revealed to be a morgue with twenty-two bodies, all of them exact duplicates of Marcus. Kang tells him that he is not the first Marcus, but the previous ones had always proved unsuitable. He had thought that Marcus was different, but then revealed that he had known all along that Marcus had helped Warbird. If Marcus had confessed, Kang would have been content to die and let Marcus be his heir. But since he had survived, Kang could not tolerate a traitor. He then stabbed Marcus in the chest, killing him.

Bibliography
 Avengers vol. 3 #41 "The High Ground" (Jun 2001)
 Avengers vol. 3 #42 "No More Tomorrows" (Jul 2001)
 Avengers vol. 3 #43 "Global Presence" (Aug 2001)
 Avengers Annual 2001 "The Third Man"/"Desperate Measures"/"Secrets Within" (2001)
 Avengers vol. 3 #44 "Down Among the Dead Men!" (Sep 2001)
 Avengers vol. 3 #45 "Life During Wartime" (Oct 2001)
 Avengers vol. 3 #46 "Absolute Mastery" (Nov 2001)
 Avengers vol. 3 #47 "In the Heart of Battle" (Dec 2001)
 Avengers vol. 3 #48 "Warplan "A" (Jan 2002)
 Avengers vol. 3 #49 "There are No Words" (Feb 2002; part of the 'Nuff Said event)
 Avengers vol. 3 #50 "Book of Revelations" (Mar 2002)
 Avengers vol. 3 #51 "Prisoners - A Love Story" (Apr 2002)
 Avengers vol. 3 #52 "Counter Attack" (May 2002)
 Avengers vol. 3 #53 "The Last Castle" (Jun 2002)
 Avengers vol. 3 #54 "Good Day To Die" (Jul 2002)
 Avengers vol. 3 #55 "The Last Farewell" (Aug 2002)

In other media
"Kang Dynasty" is the subtitle for the Marvel Cinematic Universe film Avengers: The Kang Dynasty (2025)

References

External links
 

Comics by Kurt Busiek
Holography in fiction